Didier-François d’Arclais de Montamy (1702, Montamy – 8 February 1765) was an 18th-century French civil servant, nature scholar and encyclopédiste.

De Montamy was the son of Jean Joseph, sieur de Montamy d'Arclais, seigneur de Montamy, and Marie Françoise Guillard de La Madeleine. Grand Master of France for the duke of Orléans, D'Arclais de Montamy had a high scientific education, but he was also interested in the fine arts. He translated from the German by Johann Heinrich Pott (1692–1777), la Lithogéognosie ou Examen des pierres et des terres (Paris, 1753, 2 vol. in-12°).

In 1762, he was made Chevalier de Saint Lazare de Jérusalem.

He wrote the article "Porcelaine de la Chine" for the Encyclopédie by Diderot and d'Alembert (vol. VII, 117-22).

Works (selection) 
1753: La Lithogéognosie ou Examen des pierres et des terres, Paris,
1765: Traité des couleurs pour la peinture en émail et sur la porcelaine, Chez G. Cavelier, Paris., preceded by Art de peindre sur l’émail (Paris, 1765), posthumous work published by Diderot.

Sources 
 Pierre Larousse, Grand Dictionnaire universel du XIX, vol. 11, Paris, Administration du grand Dictionnaire universel, (p. 486).

External links 
 Didier-François d’Arclais de Montamy on  Wikisource
 Didier-François d'Arclais de Montamy on CERL

1702 births
1765 deaths
People from Souleuvre en Bocage
Writers from Normandy
French translators
German–French translators
18th-century French translators
Contributors to the Encyclopédie (1751–1772)